The women's 100 metre butterfly event at the 1964 Olympic Games took place on October 14 and October 16. This swimming event used the butterfly stroke. Because an Olympic size swimming pool is 50 metres long, this race consisted of two lengths of the pool.

Medalists

Results

Heats
Heat 1

Heat 1

Heat 2

Heat 3

Heat 4

Heat 5

Semifinals

Semifinal 1

Semifinal 2

Final

Key: WR = World record

References

Women's butterfly 100 metre
Women's 100 metre butterfly
1964 in women's swimming
Women's events at the 1964 Summer Olympics